Kick 'em Jenny (also: Kick-'em-Jenny or Mt. Kick-'Em-Jenny) is an active submarine volcano or seamount on the Caribbean Sea floor, located  north of the island of Grenada and about  west of Ronde Island in the Grenadines. The South American tectonic plate is subducting the Caribbean tectonic plate to the east of this ridge and under the Lesser Antilles island arc.

Etymology
The volcano was unknown before 1939, although "Kick 'em Jenny" appeared on earlier maps as either the name of a small island now called Diamond Rock (or Île Diamante), or the name of the strait between Grenada and Ronde Island (or Île de Ronde). The name itself may be a reference to the waters sometimes being extremely rough.

Activity
The first record of the volcano was in 1939, although it must have erupted many times before that date. A small tsunami also reached the west coast of nearby Barbados, where "a sea-wave" suddenly washed over a coastal road, most likely at Paynes Bay.

The volcano has erupted on at least twelve occasions between 1939 and 2001 (the last being on December 4, 2001), although no subsequent eruption has been as large as the 1939 one, and most were only detected by seismographs. The larger eruptions have also been heard underwater or on land close to the volcano as a deep rumbling sound.

A submersible survey in 2003 detected a crater with active fumaroles releasing cold and hot gas bubbles. Samples of fresh olivine basalt were collected. An arc-shaped collapse structure appears on the west flank and was the apparent source of a submarine debris avalanche extending  down the ridge slope to the west toward the Grenada Basin.

Signs of elevated seismicity began July 11, 2015, and on July 23 a strong continuous signal was recorded by instruments observing Kick 'em Jenny, prompting authorities to raise the alert level to orange, which is the second-highest level. The following day, July 24, at 02:00 an hourlong explosion event was recorded, scientists from the University of the West Indies Seismic Research Centre observed nothing out of the ordinary at the surface above the volcano during an overflight on 25 July, and by 18:00 no activity was recorded. On 26 July the Alert Level was lowered to Yellow.

Maritime exclusion zone
The volcano is on the shipping route from St Vincent to Grenada. There is a Maritime Exclusion Zone monitored by the Seismic Research Centre of the University of the West Indies, Trinidad and Tobago. Bubbles of volcanic gases can lower water density, creating a sinking hazard. This is marked on marine charts. During periods of high seismic activity, the zone is expanded to a  radius.

See also
List of volcanoes in Grenada

References

Seamounts of the Caribbean
Volcanoes of Grenada
Seamounts of the Atlantic Ocean
Submarine volcanoes
Active volcanoes
Former islands from the last glacial maximum